Dunkerque station (French: Gare de Dunkerque) is a railway station serving the town Dunkirk, Nord department, northern France.  This part of French Flanders is near West Flanders in Belgium.

Services

The station is served by high speed trains to Lille and Paris, and by regional trains to Calais, Arras, Amiens and Lille.

Belgian Border
D'K bus *fr  run buses over the Belgian border to Adinkerke connecting with Belgian railways NMBS and in De Panne with the Kusttram.

The railway line across the border is currently out of use.

References

Railway stations in Nord (French department)
Railway stations in France opened in 1876